Didier Quentin (born 23 December 1946 in Royan, Charente-Maritime) is a French politician and a member of the Republicans (LR).

A mayor of Royan since 2008, he has been an MP of the Charente-Maritime's 5th constituency since 1997. He was a vice-president of the Charente-Maritime's General Council between 1994 and 2008 and a vice-president of the Poitou-Charentes Regional Council between 1992 and 1997.

He lost his seat in the first round of the 2022 French legislative election.

Political mandates

National mandate
 MP of the Charente-Maritime's 5th constituency (since 1 June 1997) : member of the committee of laws, vice-president of the committee of the European Affairs, president of the friendship group France/Japan, vice-president of the friendship group France/Senegal

Local mandate
 Mayor of Royan : since 9 March 2008

Former local mandates
 General councillor of Saint-Agnant: 28 March 1994 – 16 March 2008
 Vice-President of the Charente-Maritime's General Council: 28 March 1994 – 16 March 2008
 Regional councillor of Poitou-Charentes: 23 March 1992- 1 August 1997
 Vice-President of the Poitou-Charentes Regional Council: 23 March 1992 – 1 August 1997

References

External links
  Official website
  Didier Quentin's official biography, French National Assembly

1946 births
Living people
People from Royan
Rally for the Republic politicians
Union for a Popular Movement politicians
The Republicans (France) politicians
The Social Right
Gaullism, a way forward for France
Deputies of the 15th National Assembly of the French Fifth Republic
Mayors of places in Nouvelle-Aquitaine
Politics of Poitou-Charentes
Deputies of the 12th National Assembly of the French Fifth Republic
Deputies of the 13th National Assembly of the French Fifth Republic
Deputies of the 14th National Assembly of the French Fifth Republic